Sweden has participated at the Junior Eurovision Song Contest eleven times since its inception in . Two broadcasters have been responsible for Sweden's entries at Junior Eurovisionfrom 2003 to 2005, Sveriges Television (SVT) was responsible, before withdrawing with other Nordic broadcasters. From 2006 to 2009, commercial broadcaster TV4 was responsible for Sweden's entry at the Junior Eurovision.

On 29 June 2015, it was announced that SVT would withdraw for one year. However,  Sweden are yet to return to the contest.

History
Sweden are one of the sixteen countries to have made their debut at the inaugural Junior Eurovision Song Contest 2003, which took place on 15 November 2003 at the Forum in Copenhagen, Denmark.

Much like it did for the Eurovision, Sveriges Television managed the national selection for the Junior Eurovision from 2003 to 2005. SVT used a spin-off of Melodifestivalen, Lilla Melodifestivalen, which debuted in 2002 to select an entry for MGP Nordic, a then one-off junior song contest between Sweden and 2 other Nordic countries (which was temporarily put on hiatus when the JESC was established), to select its entry. However, after the 2005 contest, SVT, along with Norway's NRK and Denmark's DR, jointly pulled out of the JESC due to concerns about the treatment of the participants in the contest, and eventually reviving MGP Nordic afterwards. Many of the Swedish participants have been girls except 2011, 2013, and the spokespersons from 2003 to 2009.

fter SVT pulled out, commercial broadcaster TV4 decided to take over organizing the Swedish delegation for the JESC. TV4 would organize its own competition to select its entry for the JESC, while in parallel, SVT's contest would still be active, but with its winner being sent to MGP Nordic instead. In the 2006 contest, the first under TV4's control, Sweden would achieve their best result in the JESC, finishing in 3rd place with Molly Sandén's song "Det finaste någon kan få". In 2007 Sandéns younger sister Frida Sandén won the right to represent Sweden in the Junior Eurovision 2007. Before going to Rotterdam Frida had hopes built to score as high as her elder sister but only managed to get 8th place with 83 points. TV4 withdrew from the 2008 contest due to concerns about its viewership, and its plans for the 2008 season. However, TV4 confirmed that it would return for the 2009 edition.

On 9 April 2010, TV4 decided to withdraw again from Junior Eurovision in Minsk. However, the European Broadcasting Union confirmed on 28 July 2010 that Sweden would participate in the contest, after SVT decided to return to the contest. On 24 January 2015, SVT announced the cancellation of Lilla Melodifestivalen as the national selection for the Junior Eurovision Song Contest, and instead plans to come up with a new contest. No details about this have been unveiled. On 29 June 2015, it was announced that SVT, the Swedish national broadcaster, would withdraw for one year and thus not compete for Sweden in the forthcoming contest in Bulgaria. TV4 was not prepared for a withdrawal and therefore ruled out participating.  Sweden has yet to return to the Junior Eurovision Song Contest.

Participation overview

Photogallery

Commentators and spokespersons

The contests are broadcast online worldwide through the official Junior Eurovision Song Contest website junioreurovision.tv and YouTube. In 2015, the online broadcasts featured commentary in English by junioreurovision.tv editor Luke Fisher and 2011 Bulgarian Junior Eurovision Song Contest entrant Ivan Ivanov. The Swedish broadcaster sent their own commentator to each contest in order to provide commentary in the Swedish language. Spokespersons were also chosen by the national broadcaster in order to announce the awarding points from Sweden. The table below list the details of each commentator and spokesperson since 2003.

See also
Sweden in the Eurovision Dance Contest – Dance version of the Eurovision Song Contest.
Sweden in the Eurovision Song Contest – Senior version of the Junior Eurovision Song Contest.
Sweden in the Eurovision Young Dancers – A competition organised by the EBU for younger dancers aged between 16 and 21.
Sweden in the Eurovision Young Musicians – A competition organised by the EBU for musicians aged 18 years and younger.

References

 
Sweden
Junior Eurovision Song Contest